Lomandra laxa is a perennial, rhizomatous herb found in the Australian states of New South Wales and Queensland.

References

laxa
Asparagales of Australia
Flora of New South Wales
Flora of Queensland